Ludovica Modugno (12 January 1949 – 26 October 2021) was an Italian actress who specialized in dubbing.

Biography
Modugno made her debut at the age of four in the film Il Dottor Antonio. She debuted in dubbing in 1955 with the film Miracle of Marcelino. In 1978, she founded the theatre company L'albero alongside Gigi Angelillo. In 2008, she won the best theatre actress prize from the Associazione Nazionale Critici di Teatro. As a voice actress, she was the regular dubbing voice of Glenn Close.

Modugno was the sister of actor and radio host Paolo Modugno and the wife of actor and director Gigi Angelillo. 

She died in Rome on 26 October 2021, at the age of 72.

Filmography

Cinema
 (1969)
 (1973)
Volevo i pantaloni (1990)
 (1993)
Mille bolle blu (1993)
Camerieri (1995)
Heartless (1995)
 (1996)
 (1996)
Gli inaffidabili (1997)
Kaputt Mundi (1998)
Come tu mi vuoi (2007)
 (2009)
The Big Dream (2009)
Cado dalle nubi (2009)
Ma tu di che segno sei? (2014)
Quo Vado? (2016)
Magical Nights (2018)
 (2019)

Television

 (1956)
 (1959)
 (1960)
 (1972)
 (1972)
L'avvocato delle donne (1997)
Il maresciallo Rocca (2001)
Una donna per amico (2001)
 (2005)
Distretto di Polizia (2010)
 (2010)
Al di là del lago (2011)
 (2012)

References

1949 births
2021 deaths
Actresses from Rome
Italian film actresses
Italian voice actresses
Italian television actresses
Italian stage actresses
Italian child actresses
Italian voice directors
20th-century Italian actresses
21st-century Italian actresses